Asteras Amaliadas F.C. is a Greek football club, based in Amaliada, Elis.

The club was founded in 1947. They played in Gamma Ethniki for the season 2018–19.

History
The team was founded in 1947 with the name "White Aster". In 1962 the team merged with Ethnikos Amaliada and created Korivos. Five years later, in 1967 the "White" was removed from the name of the club and then continues under the name Asteras Amaliada F.C..

Honours

Domestic
  Elis FCA Champions: 12
 1971–72, 1973–74, 1976–77, 1979–80, 1987–88, 1994–95, 1996–97, 1999–00, 2006–07, 2009–10, 2014–15, 2015–16
  Elis FCA Cup Winners: 14
 1983–84, 1985–86, 1990–91, 1994–95, 1997–98, 1998–99, 1999–00, 2000–01, 2001–02, 2002–03, 2003–04, 2009–10, 2014–15, 2017–18

Notable players 

Gamma Ethniki clubs
Elis
Association football clubs established in 1947
Football clubs in Western Greece
1947 establishments in Greece